B-Sides & Rarities is a compilation album by alternative metal band Deftones, consisting of a CD and a DVD. The CD compiled previously released and unreleased B-sides, while the DVD featured multimedia content, including a complete videography. It was released in 2005 by Maverick Records.

Reception
"B-Sides and Rarities is an overall resounding effort by perhaps the smartest members of the now moribund Nü-Metal genre", said Ayo Jegede of Stylus Magazine. He went on to say, "Each of these B-sides and alternates replicates a period in their career, so while the songs themselves may be new, they perfectly encapsulate each album of the band’s catalogue as though they were overarching epochs".

Track listing

CD

DVD
 "7 Words"
 "Bored"
 "My Own Summer (Shove It)"
 "Be Quiet and Drive (Far Away)"
 "Change (In the House of Flies)"
 "Back to School (Mini Maggit)"
 "Digital Bath"
 "Minerva"
 "Hexagram"
 "Bloody Cape"
 "Engine Number 9"
 "Root"

Personnel

Deftones
Deftones –  producer, compilation producer
Chino Moreno –  vocals
Stephen Carpenter –  guitar; photography
Frank Delgado – keyboards; photography 
Chi Cheng –  bass
Abe Cunningham – drums; photography

Additional personnel
Dave Aaron – engineer, mixing
Karen Ahmed – project supervisor
Tom Baker – remastering
Andy Bennett – video director
Chris Burns – video director
Terry Date –  producer, engineer, mixing, remixing
Darren Doane –  video director
Mike Donk – photography
Nick Egan – video director
Mike Engstrom – project manager
Sharyl Farber – project assistant
Paul Fedor – video director
Joe Fraulob – guitar, engineer, soloist, mixing
Jay Goin – assistant
Patrick Haley – photography
Sam Hofstedt – assistant
Paul Hunter – video director
Joe Johnston – engineer, mixing
Dean Karr – video director
Nick Lambrou –  video editor
Nick Lambrou –  DVD editor
Frank Maddocks – creative director, creative design
Jonah Sonz Matranga – vocals
James Minchin – photography, video director
Scott Olson – guitar
Purge – video director
Esther Somlo – project supervisor
Dorothy Stefanski – project assistant
Eric Steinman – engineer
Robbie Snow – project manager
Brian Virtue – producer, engineer, mixing
Amy Weiser – photography
Ulrich Wild – assistant
Steve Woolard – project assistant
Russ Busby – videographer, video editor, video director

Chart positions

References 

Deftones albums
B-side compilation albums
Albums produced by Terry Date
2005 compilation albums
2005 video albums
Music video compilation albums
Maverick Records compilation albums
Maverick Records video albums
Rhino Entertainment compilation albums